Antti Uimaniemi (born 30 January 1986) is a Finnish footballer who currently plays for FC Honka in Finnish Kakkonen.

References
 Guardian Football
 Antti Uimaniemi – Vaasan Palloseura

Finnish footballers
Rovaniemen Palloseura players
Veikkausliiga players
Myllykosken Pallo −47 players
1986 births
Living people
People from Kemi
Association football defenders
Sportspeople from Lapland (Finland)